The SCW Tag Team Championship was a professional wrestling tag team championship in Southern Championship Wrestling (SCW). It remained active until early-1990 when SCW was closed.

The inaugural champions were "Wildfire" Tommy Rich and Ted Oates, who defeated Bob Orton, Jr. and "Dirty" Dick Slater in a tournament final in 1988 to become the first SCW Tag Team Champions. Thunder & Lightning (Steve Lawler and Dino Minelli) holds the record for most reigns, with two. At 68 days, Thunder & Lightning's first reign is the longest in the title's history. Overall, there have been 12 reigns shared between 11 wrestlers, with one vacancy, and 1 deactivation.

Title history

References
General

Specific

Tag team wrestling championships